Arran is a special service area in the Canadian province of Saskatchewan within the Rural Municipality of Livingston No. 331 and Census Division No. 9. It held village status between 1916 and 2022.

History 

The area around Arran was part of the "North Reserve", also known as "Thunder Hill Reserve", one of the block settlement areas allocated for the Doukhobor immigrants who arrived in 1899 from Russia's Transcaucasian provinces.

Arran incorporated as a village on September 21, 1916. It restructured on January 1, 2023, relinquishing its village status in favour of becoming a special service area under the jurisdiction of the Rural Municipality of Livingston No. 331. The community was named after the Isle of Arran in Scotland.

Historic sites
 Ukrainian Orthodox Church of Ascension, 9.5 kilometres southeast of Arran.

Geography 

Climate

Demographics 

Education 
Arran School opened on November 30, 1914 and closed on June 30, 1994.

See also 
 List of communities in Saskatchewan
 Villages of Saskatchewan

References 

Villages in Saskatchewan
Livingston No. 331, Saskatchewan
Division No. 9, Saskatchewan